Viamópolis is a Brazilian district within the municipality of Viamão, in Rio Grande do Sul. It belongs to the group of three districts predominantly urban, with Passo do Sabão and Viamão.

References

Districts of Viamão